The 2022 CAFA U-19 Futsal Championship was the first edition of the CAFA U-19 Futsal Championship, the international youth futsal championship organised by CAFA for the men's under-19 national teams of Central Asia. The tournament was held at the Gazprom Arena in Bishkek, Kyrgyzstan between 12–19 February 2022.

Iran won the title to become the first CAFA U-19 Futsal Championship champions. Host Kyrgyz Republic finished third after achieving 6 points after winning two matches against the teams of Uzbekistan and Tajikistan.

Participating nations
A total of 5 (out of 6) CAFA member national teams entered the tournament.

Did not enter

Venues
Matches were held at the Gazprom Arena.

Match officials
A total of 10 referees were appointed for the tournament.

Referees

  Esmail Kamar Basteh
  Ali Ahmadi
  Nursultan Salamat Uulu
  Eldiiar Keldibekov
  Nurbek Arstanbek Uulu
  Sukhrob Sattorov
  Behruz Murtazoev
  Adham Rihsiboyev
  Khushnudbek Atamuratov
  Anatoly Rubakov

Squads

Main tournament 
The main tournament schedule was announced on 6 February 2022.

Goalscorers

Awards
The following awards were given at the conclusion of the tournament:

The ranking for the Top Goalscorer was determined using the following criteria: goals, assists and fewest minutes played.

References

External links

2022 in Asian futsal
Sport in Bishkek
2022 CAFA Under-19 Futsal Championship
2022 in youth association football